Outcome Bias, also known as the Disparity Fallacy and Equity Fallacy, is a form of confirmation bias, and by extension a cognitive bias. This error arises when a decision is based on the outcome of previous events, without regard to how the past events developed. Outcome bias does not involve analysis of factors that lead to a previous event, and instead de-emphasizes the events preceding the outcomes and overemphasizes the outcome. Unlike hindsight bias, outcome bias does not involve the distortion of past events.

While similar to the hindsight bias, the two phenomena are markedly different. Hindsight bias focuses on memory distortion to favor the actor, while the outcome bias focuses exclusively on weighting the past outcome heavier than other pieces of information in deciding if a past decision was correct.

Overview
One will often judge a past decision by its ultimate outcome instead of based on the quality of the decision at the time it was made, given what was known at that time. This is an error because no decision-maker ever knows whether or not a calculated risk will turn out for the best. The actual outcome of the decision will often be determined by chance, with some risks working out and others not. Individuals whose judgments are influenced by outcome bias are seemingly holding decision-makers responsible for events beyond their control.

Baron and Hershey (1988) presented subjects with hypothetical situations in order to test this.
One such example involved a surgeon deciding whether or not to do a risky surgery on a patient. The surgery had a known probability of success. Subjects were presented with either a good or bad outcome (in this case living or dying), and asked to rate the quality of the surgeon's pre-operation decision. Those presented with bad outcomes rated the decision worse than those who had good outcomes. "The ends justify the means" is an often used aphorism to express the Outcome effect when the outcome is desirable.

The reason why an individual makes this mistake is that he or she will incorporate currently available information when evaluating a past decision. To avoid the influence of outcome bias, one would evaluate a decision by ignoring information collected after the fact and focusing on what the right answer is, or was at the time the decision was made.

Outside of psychological experiments, the outcome bias has been found to be substantially present in real world situations.  A study looking at the evaluation of football players' performance by coaches and journalists found that players' performance is judged to be substantially better—over a whole match—if the player had a lucky goal rather than an unlucky miss (after a player's shot hit one of the goal posts).  This is an example of how the outcome bias can cloud people's judgment and cause them to focus on the final result rather than the actual process and performance of the player.

Another study found that the outcome bias can affect the decision-making process of doctors and healthcare providers. The study showed that doctors were more likely to prescribe a certain treatment if the outcome of the previous patient was positive, even if the previous patient had different symptoms and medical history than the current patient.  This shows how the outcome bias can interfere with the objective and evidence-based decision making that is necessary for quality patient care.

The outcome bias can also play a role in the discourse surrounding the wage gap. Advocates of the wage gap often point to the disparity between the median earnings of men and women, without considering other factors such as job tenure, experience, education, and other individual characteristics that may contribute to wage differences. By overemphasizing the outcome without examining the events leading up to it, the wage gap debate becomes a classic case of outcome bias.  One study conducted by the National Bureau of Economic Research found that the gender wage gap is not the result of gender discrimination, but rather the result of differences in education, experience, and career choices made by men and women. The study found that after controlling for these factors, the raw gender pay gap diminished to only 5%. By not examining the underlying factors that contribute to the wage gap, advocates of the wage gap risk perpetuating the outcome bias. It is crucial to consider all relevant information and to avoid drawing conclusions based solely on the outcome, especially in complex social and economic issues such as the wage gap.

The outcome bias is closely related to the philosophical concept of moral luck as in both concepts, the evaluation of actions is influenced by factors that are not logically justifiable.

See also
 Deontology vs. teleology and consequentialism (ethical theories)
 Group attribution error
 Hindsight bias
 Historian's fallacy
 List of cognitive biases

References

Cognitive biases